The 2018 Outback Bowl was an American college football bowl game played on January 1, 2018, at Raymond James Stadium in Tampa, Florida. The 32nd annual Outback Bowl was one of the 2017–18 NCAA football bowl games concluding the 2017 NCAA Division I FBS football season. The game was nationally televised on ESPN2, and its title sponsor is the Outback Steakhouse restaurant franchise.

Teams
The game featured the Michigan Wolverines of the Big Ten Conference, and the South Carolina Gamecocks of the Southeastern Conference in their fourth meeting against each other, and second meeting in the Outback Bowl.

Michigan

After finishing their regular season with an 8–4 record, the Wolverines were selected to their sixth Outback Bowl appearance, the most Outback Bowl appearances by any team. This was their 46th bowl game appearance, the 11th-highest total all-time among FBS schools.

South Carolina

After finishing their regular season with an 8–4 record, the Gamecocks were selected to their fifth Outback Bowl appearance, tying them with four other teams for the second-most Outback Bowl appearances. This was their 22nd bowl game appearance. South Carolina won the previous meeting against the Michigan Wolverines in the 2013 Outback Bowl, by a score of 33–28.

Game summary

Scoring summary

Statistics

Mascot
The 2018 Outback Bowl marked the first appearance of SB Nation sportswriter and mixed martial artist Ryan Nanni as the Bloomin' Onion mascot.

References

2017–18 NCAA football bowl games
2018
2018 Outback Bowl
2018 Outback Bowl
2018 in sports in Florida
January 2018 sports events in the United States